Andrzej Jan Lech (born 15 May 1946 in Gdynia) is a former Polish handball player who competed in the 1972 Summer Olympics.

In 1972 he was part of the Polish team which finished tenth. He played four matches and scored two goals.

External links
profile 

1946 births
Living people
Polish male handball players
Olympic handball players of Poland
Handball players at the 1972 Summer Olympics
Sportspeople from Gdynia
20th-century Polish people